The Presbyterian Church in Korea (BokUm) was formed after a split in the Presbyterian Church in Korea (HapDong). A Presbytery was formed that developed into a denomination. The BokUm church had 27,000 members and 122 congregations. It accepts the Westminster Confession and the Apostles Creed.

Presbyterian denominations in South Korea
Presbyterian denominations in Asia